Zatiruha (sometimes zatiukha or zatirukha) is a Russian soup with handmade noodles. It is a type of paste soup or flour soup. The name comes from the verb тереть ("rub"); the noodles are made by rubbing floury hands together to form pellet-like dumplings or noodles. It is considered a peasant dish. In Belarus the dish is known as zatsirka, in Ukraine as zatirka, and a similar dish called umach ashi is known in other countries. In Polish, the dish is known as "Zacierki" (the name is in plural) and is usually served as a milk soup.

Origins legend 
According to legend, after kneading bread dough, a worker in a wealthy house did not wash her hands and so returned to her home, where she rubbed her palms together and boiled the resulting pellets of dough to feed her children.

Preparation 
The palms of the hands are dipped into a beaten egg, milk or water, then into flour. After that, the palms are rubbed against each other over a plate. The resulting dough pellets are boiled in broth or water. Other ingredients can include potatoes, sautéed onions and carrots, green onions, parsley, dill, bay leaves, and seasoning. Some recipes call for meat or mushrooms. A milk soup or porridge is also made using a similar method.

References 

Russian soups
Noodles
Ukrainian soups